1988 Delores, provisional designation , is a stony Florian asteroid from the inner regions of the asteroid belt, approximately 5 kilometers in diameter.

It was discovered on 28 September 1952, by IU's Indiana Asteroid Program at the Goethe Link Observatory near Brooklyn, Indiana, United States, and named after Delores Owings, a member of the program.

Classification and orbit 

Delores is a stony S-type asteroid and member of the Flora family, one of the largest groups of stony asteroids in the main-belt. It orbits the Sun in the inner main-belt at a distance of 1.9–2.4 AU once every 3 years and 2 months (1,155 days).

Its orbit has an eccentricity of 0.10 and an inclination of 4° with respect to the ecliptic.

Physical characteristics

Rotation period 

A rotational lightcurve of Delores was obtained at the Palomar Transient Factory in October 2012. It gave a rotation period of 88 hours and a brightness variation of 0.74 magnitude.

While not being a slow rotator, a period of 88 hours is significantly above average, as most minor planets rotate once every 2–20 hours around their axis. It has also a high brightness amplitude, which typically indicates that the body has a non-spheroidal shape.

Diameter and albedo 

According to the survey carried out by NASA's Wide-field Infrared Survey Explorer with its subsequent NEOWISE mission, Delores measures 5.8 kilometers in diameter and its surface has an albedo of 0.19, while the Collaborative Asteroid Lightcurve Link assumes an albedo of 0.24 — derived from 8 Flora, the family's largest member and namesake – and calculates a diameter of 4.6 kilometers with an absolute magnitude of 13.85.

Naming 

This minor planet was named after Delores Owings, member in the Indiana Asteroid Program of Indiana University, collaborator with Tom Gehrels on the determination of absolute magnitudes of minor planets, who became the program's supervisor of astrometric measurements on photographic plates. The naming was suggested by Paul Herget, the then director of the Minor Planet Center (MPC). The official  was published by the Minor Planet Center on 30 June 1977.

References

External links 
 Asteroid Lightcurve Database (LCDB), query form (info )
 Dictionary of Minor Planet Names, Google books
 Asteroids and comets rotation curves, CdR – Observatoire de Genève, Raoul Behrend
 Discovery Circumstances: Numbered Minor Planets (1)-(5000) – Minor Planet Center
 
 

001988
001988
Named minor planets
19520928